The 2018 Supercoppa Italiana was the 31st edition of the Supercoppa Italiana, the Italian football super cup. It was played on 16 January 2019 at King Abdullah Sports City in Jeddah, Saudi Arabia. With Juventus winning both the 2017–18 Serie A championship and the 2017–18 Coppa Italia, the game was played between Juventus and the 2017–18 Coppa Italia runners-up, Milan.

This was the third meeting between the two teams in the Supercoppa Italiana. Juventus won the first meeting in 2003 in East Rutherford, New Jersey on penalties, and Milan returned the favour, also on penalties in 2016 in Qatar. Both teams before the match had a record seven Supercoppa titles. Saudi Arabia became the sixth different country to host a Supercoppa Italiana. Juventus won the match, with the only goal coming from Cristiano Ronaldo in the 61st minute, and became the first club to win eight Supercoppa Italiana titles.

Match

Details

Controversy
Following the murder of the dissident Saudi journalist Jamal Khashoggi in the Saudi embassy in Turkey in October 2018, activists and humanitarian associations including Amnesty International have appealed to both the finalist teams and Lega Serie A for the match not to be played in Saudi Arabia. Amnesty International indicated the event as an attempt to "rebrand" its tarnished image, known as "sportswashing".

Matteo Salvini, the deputy prime minister of Italy, also labelled the decision to play the match in Saudi Arabia as "disgusting" due to laws regarding women attending the match. Laura Boldrini stated that "the lords of football should not be allowed to trade women's rights." President of Lega Serie A Gaetano Micciché noted progress compared to a year ago when no women at all were allowed in the stadium. Women will only be allowed in one section of the stadium, which comprises around 15 percent of the 60,000 seats, and will not be allowed to sit elsewhere in the stadium. However, Micciché has defended the decision to host the Supercoppa in Saudi Arabia stating that this will help to promote the Italian game to a worldwide audience. He also said that women in Saudi Arabia are allowed to attend matches since January 2018, adding that women will be able to sit in family area.

The Serie A's MENA rightsholder beIN Sports condemned the hosting of the Supercoppa in Saudi Arabia in response to the pirate broadcaster BeoutQ. beIN Sports had been forced to cease offering its services in Saudi Arabia due to the Qatar diplomatic crisis, which has led to BeoutQ illegally retransmitting its programming in the country as an alternative outlet. beIN Sports has repeatedly accused the service of operating from within Saudi Arabia. In November 2019, beIN Sports threatened to cut its ties with the Serie A over the Saudi deal, accusing it of "making a quick buck from the very entity that has been stealing its rights for two years."

See also

 2018–19 Serie A
 2018–19 Coppa Italia

References 

2018
Juventus F.C. matches
A.C. Milan matches
2018–19 in Italian football cups
Sports competitions in Saudi Arabia
January 2019 sports events in Asia